The Bloomingdale Trail is a  elevated rail trail linear park running east–west on the northwest side of Chicago. It is the longest greenway project of a former elevated rail line in the Western Hemisphere, and the second longest in the world, after the Promenade plantee linear park in Paris. In 2015, the City of Chicago converted the former Bloomingdale railway line to an elevated greenway, which forms the backbone of the 606 trail network. The Bloomingdale Trail elevated park is in the Logan Square, Humboldt Park, and West Town neighborhoods.

History

The Bloomingdale Line was constructed in 1873 by the Chicago & Pacific Railroad Company as part of the  Elgin subdivision from Halsted Street in Chicago to the suburb of Elgin, Illinois. It was soon absorbed by the Chicago, Milwaukee, St. Paul and Pacific Railway (also known as the Milwaukee Road), first via a 999-year lease in 1880 and later with a fee simple deed conveyance to the same in 1900. As a result of mergers and acquisitions, it became part of the Soo Line Railroad (a subsidiary of the Canadian Pacific Railway [CP]), which owned the corridor. The City of Chicago purchased the property right-of-way from CP in January 2013.

The rail line was elevated approximately twenty feet in the 1910s as result of a city ordinance aimed at reducing pedestrian fatalities at grade crossings. The line had been a street-running railway within Bloomingdale Avenue, an east–west street running at 1800 north; creating the embankment reduced Bloomingdale Avenue's width in some cases, rendering it an alleyway in some portions. Steel-reinforced concrete embankment walls line the corridor, with 38 viaducts built.

The railway was used for both passenger and freight trains and served several local industrial businesses, including a Schwinn Bicycle Company warehouse. The Bloomingdale Line was primarily used to reach the Lakewood Branch and industrial district on Goose Island. The last freight train operated over the line in 2001.

The Bloomingdale Avenue embankment continues west of the trail terminus at Ridgeway Avenue, where it intersects with Metra's commuter tracks of the Milwaukee Road, with northbound North Line trains continuing toward Fox Lake, using the CP C&M Subdivision and West Line trains running along the Bloomingdale tracks west to Elgin via the CP Elgin Subdivision. The tracks lower to surface-level on the western outskirts of the city.

Construction

The City of Chicago first investigated converting the Bloomingdale Line into a greenway in 1997, but the railway was still in active use. The city and community reintroduced the greenway concept as part of the Logan Square Open Space Plan in 2002–2004."  This plan proposed a linear park or greenway with several public access ramps. At the east end, a trailhead would be created at the Chicago River.

A grassroots, non-profit organization, Friends of the Bloomingdale Trail (FBT), was formed in 2003 to be the focal point for advocacy and community involvement in the conversion project. FBT has partnered with the City and The Trust for Public Land, a national non-profit land conservation group, in a collaboration that will lead the project management, design, and development.

Collins Engineers, Inc. was selected to provide Phase II design. A groundbreaking ceremony occurred on August 27, 2013, at what would become the Milwaukee Avenue / Leavitt Street connection to the trail.

The corridor is the backbone of the 606 parks and trail network. The numeric name is an homage to the city's ZIP Codes, the prefix for nearly all of which is 606. The trail runs from Ashland Avenue west to North Ridgeway Avenue, parallel to West Bloomingdale Avenue.

In November 2013, the Alphawood Foundation offered a $2 million grant to finance the project. The park officially opened on June 6, 2015. There have been various proposals to connect the trail to the former A. Finkl & Sons Steel property, a 22-acre site in Lincoln Park.

See also
List of rail trails

References

External links

The Bloomingdale Trail official website
The 606 official website
Forgotten Chicago: "The Bloomingdale Line"
Public Meeting Presentation: 09/24/12

Canadian Pacific Railway

A 2009 map of the project

Rail trails in Illinois
Bike paths in the Chicago metropolitan area
Parks in Chicago
Linear parks
Articles containing video clips
Elevated parks
2015 establishments in Illinois